Mawlānā Muhammad Abdullah Ghazi (  – 17 October 1998) was a Pakistani Islamic scholar who served as Chairman of Ruet-e-Hilal Committee and as the first Imam and Khatib of Lal Masjid, and founded Faridia University and Jamia Hafsa.

He Graduated from Jamia Uloom-ul-Islamia and served as the first Imam and Khatib of Lal Masjid, the first mosque to be established in the new capital.

In 1971, he founded Jamia Faridia in Islamabad, the first Islamic seminary to be established in Islamabad. He taught hadith at the madrasah, and was well-known by the title "Shaykh al-Hadith".

He also served as the Chairman of Ruet-e-Hilal Committee, and led the organization till assassination in 1998.

Early life 
Muhammad Abdullah Ghazi was born on 1 June 1935 in a village of Basti-Abdullah, district Rajanpur into the family of Ghazi Muhammad descending from the Sadwani (Sodvani) clan of the Mazari tribe of Baluchistan. His father was socially active, which got him in trouble many times and he was arrested by the British and sentenced to 8 years in Jail. In Jail, he became religious and motivated Abdullah to join a local madrassa.

At the age of seven, Ghazi enrolled into Madrasa Khudam-ul-Qur'an of Rahim Yar Khan, to complete the Hifz (memorization of the Quran). 

After his primary education, Ghazi went to study at Jamia Qasim Ul Uloom in Multan for further education, where he studied for 5 years and was a student of Mufti Mahmud.

He then went to Karachi, and joined Jamia Uloom-ul-Islamia, Karachi, from where he completed his Dars-i Nizami in 1957, and was among the top students of Muhammad Yousuf Banuri.

After completing his Dars-i Nizami, he served as Imam of Jamia Masjid Rashidiya, Malir for few years.

When the capital moved to Islamabad, and Lal Masjid, Islamabad was established, Ghazi became its first sermon preacher in 1965 upon the recommendation of his teacher Muhammad Yousuf Banuri.

Lal Masjid

Ghazi's sermons drew in thousands of worshippers including President Muhammad Zia-ul-Haq who was a regular visitor to the mosque as before the completion of the Faisal Mosque, The Lal Masjid had been the only main congregational mosque in Islamabad. 

Upon completion of the Faisal Mosque in 1986, President Zia ul Haq requested that Ghazi take the position of the first Imam at the newly built mosque.

However, Ghazi declined the offer, preferring to continue his role as the Imam and Khatib of Lal Masjid, where he had already established himself as a known religious figure and had gained a strong following.

Establishing Jamia Faridia 

In 1966, He established a small seminary at Lal Masjid, in which there were about 20 to 25 students for the Hifz class. After some time a need was felt to have a bigger place for running this seminary so that a large number of students who were increasing with the passage of time could be accommodated.

Hence In 1971, a place in the meadows of the Margalla Hills in the city's Prime Sector E-7, was acquired with the help and cooperation of several of his close friends most notably Seth Haroon Jaffer (Jaffer Group of Companies), Haji Akhtar Hassan (OSD Kashmir Affairs & Finance Secretary of Azad Kashmir), and Admiral Mohammad. Shariff, NI(M), HJ (Rtd). 

The seminary was shifted to the present building and it was named "Jamia Faridia" and later became known as "Al Faridia University".

In 1992, he laid the foundation for Jamia Hafsa, which later on became the largest female seminary of Asia, Maulana remained the Chancellor for Both Seminaries till his Assassination in 1998

Soviet–Afghan War

During the Soviet–Afghan War (1979–1989), the Red Mosque played a major role in recruiting and training Mujahideen to fight alongside the Afghan Mujahideen against Soviet troops.

A few months before his assassination in 1998, Ghazi and his friend and renowned scholar Maulana Zahoor Ahmad Alwi (Founder Jamia Muhammadia) and some other scholars went to Afghanistan. He took his rebellious son especially with him and met Mullah Omar, Osama Bin Laden and Ayman Al Zawahiri

Assassination
His biographer, Mufti Riaz Munsoor, wrote extensively about his daily routine. According to Mansoor,  Ghazi had a strict schedule that he followed every day. He would walk seven kilometers from his home to his seminary, Jamia Faridia, where he would give lectures to his students. on his way back, he would stop at the Polyclinic Hospital to bless the patients and offer them words of encouragement.

On the day of his assassination, Ghazi followed his routine as usual. He walked to Jamia Faridia to give his lectures and then stopped at the hospital on his way back. As he approached Lal Masjid, a man was waiting for him in the courtyard. the man greeted Ghazi and then pulled out a gun, opening fire and emptying a full magazine. Ghazi was badly injured, while the assassin escaped with the help of accomplices waiting outside in a car, Ghazi died of his injuries on the way to the to the same hospital, he had been aware of threats to his life, but he had always refused to have a bodyguard, saying that he would rather die alone than risk someone else's life with him.

The President of Pakistan Rafiq Tarar expressed his sadness over the assassination in a letter, adding that "Maulana Abdullah Ghazi had spent his whole life for Islam, and kept the tradition of Ulema alive, his struggles will forever be remembered".

He is buried in the courtyard of Faridia University, Islamabad. The seminary's Jamia Masjid is named after him.

In his honour his hometown was also renamed "Basti-Abdullah" and a new seminary was constructed there, the town gained worldwide attention in 2007 when Abdul Rashid Ghazi was buried in the courtyard of the seminary, Abdullah Railway Station near the town is also named after him.

FIR and Case

Due to a lack of trust in Pakistan's legal system, Ghazi's elder son refused to lodged FIR, but his younger son, Abdul Rashid Ghazi  lodged the FIR and the police investigated the case. After a relentless effort, a man was arrested and afterwards, during the ID parade, an eyewitness identified the assassin. However, he was released the next day without reason. Abdul Rashid Ghazi protested against the release and warned the police of legal action if the suspect was not arrested soon. With Ghazi increasing pressure on police, he was asked to withdraw the case or face the fate of his father. According to his friend, this was a turning point in Ghazi's life, and he became disillusioned with the system.

Memoir 

In 2005, a memoir was published by Maktaba Faridia detailing his life under the name Hayat Shaheed E Islam Written by Mufti Riaz Munsoor.

References
Biography Book: Hayat Shaheed E Islam

1935 births
1998 deaths
Assassinated Pakistani Islamic scholars
Deobandis
Pakistani religious leaders
Pakistani Sunni Muslim scholars of Islam
Deaths by firearm in Islamabad
Assassinated religious leaders
Baloch people
People from Rajanpur District
Jamia Qasim Ul Uloom alumni